Domen Črnigoj (born 18 November 1995) is a Slovenian professional footballer who plays as a midfielder for Serie A club Salernitana, on loan from Venezia. He represents the Slovenia national team.

Club career

Koper 
Črnigoj made his Slovenian PrvaLiga debut for Koper on 1 August 2012 against Aluminij, replacing Denis Popović after 87 minutes of the match.

Lugano 
In August 2015, Črnigoj transferred to Swiss Super League club Lugano.

Venezia 
In August 2020, Črnigoj signed a three-year contract with Italian Serie B club Venezia. In November 2021, he extended his contract until 2025.

Salernitana (loan)
On 26 January 2023, Črnigoj signed for Serie A club Salernitana on loan until the end of the season with the option to make the move permanent.

Career statistics

International 
Scores and results list Slovenia's goal tally first, score column indicates score after each Črnigoj goal.

References

External links
Domen Črnigoj at NZS 

1995 births
Living people
Sportspeople from Koper
Slovenian footballers
Association football midfielders
FC Koper players
FC Lugano players
Venezia F.C. players
U.S. Salernitana 1919 players
Slovenian PrvaLiga players
Swiss Super League players
Serie B players
Serie A players
Slovenia youth international footballers
Slovenia under-21 international footballers
Slovenia international footballers
Slovenian expatriate footballers
Slovenian expatriate sportspeople in Switzerland
Expatriate footballers in Switzerland
Slovenian expatriate sportspeople in Italy
Expatriate footballers in Italy